HMS E9 was a British E class submarine built by Vickers, Barrow. She was laid down on 1 June 1912 and was commissioned on 18 June 1914.

Design 
She was powered by two  Vickers eight-cylinder two-stroke diesel engines and two  electric motors.

E9 was not fitted with a deck gun during construction, and it is not known whether one was fitted later, as was the case with many boats up to E19. She was the first of her class to be constructed with five 18 inch (450 mm) torpedo tubes, two in the bow, one either side amidships, and one in the stern; a total of 10 torpedoes were carried.

E-Class submarines had wireless systems with  power ratings; in some submarines, these were later upgraded to  systems by removing a midship torpedo tube. Their maximum design depth was  although in service some reached depths of below . Some submarines contained Fessenden oscillator systems.

Crew 
Her complement was three officers and 28 men.

Service history 

When war was declared with Germany on 5 August 1914, E9 was based at Harwich, in the 8th Submarine Flotilla of the Home Fleets.

At dawn on 13 September 1914, the submarine, commanded by Lieutenant-Commander Horton, torpedoed the German light cruiser  six miles southwest of Heligoland. Hela was hit amidships with the two torpedoes, fired from a range of 600 yards. All but two of her crew were rescued by the German submarine U-18 and another German ship. Although pursued most of the day by German naval forces, E9 managed to reach Harwich safely. For sinking the cruiser and the destroyer, Horton was awarded the Distinguished Service Order (DSO).

HMS E9 was salvaged for breaking in Finland in August 1953.

The Jolly Roger Tradition 

While in command of the E9, Horton initiated the tradition of submarines flying the Jolly Roger upon returning from successful combat patrols. Remembering comments by First Sea Lord Admiral Sir Arthur Wilson, who complained that submarines were "underhanded, unfair, and damned un-English" and that personnel should be hanged as pirates, Horton flew the flag when the E9 returned to port following the sinking of the Hela. They flew additional flags after each successful patrol, but when there was no room for more flags, they began adding symbols, each indicating a certain achievement, to a single large flag. This practice was imitated by other British submarines during World War I, and it was renewed again during World War II. The Admiralty initially disapproved of the practice, but was unable to stop it. The Jolly Roger has since been adopted as the logo of the Royal Navy Submarine Service.

References 

 Akerman, P. (1989). Encyclopaedia of British submarines 1901–1955.  p. 150. Maritime Books. 

 

British E-class submarines of the Royal Navy
Ships built in Barrow-in-Furness
1913 ships
World War I submarines of the United Kingdom
World War I shipwrecks in the Baltic Sea
Royal Navy ship names
Maritime incidents in 1918
Shipwrecks of Finland
Scuttled vessels of the United Kingdom